Jorge Silva or Jorge da Silva may refer to:

Jorge Silva (footballer, born 1959), retired Portuguese football striker
Jorge da Silva (born 1961), retired Uruguayan football striker
Jorge Silva (Brazilian boxer) (born 1966), Brazilian boxer
Jorge da Silva (athlete) (born 1966), Brazilian Olympic athlete
Jorge Silva (footballer, born 1972), Portuguese football goalkeeper
Jorge Silva (footballer, born 1975), Portuguese football defender
Jorge Silva (volleyball) (born 1980), Venezuelan volleyball player
Jorge Silva (Mexican boxer) (born 1992), Mexican boxer
Jorge Silva (footballer, born 1996), Portuguese football defender